Sviatoshyn may refer to:
 Sviatoshyn (Svyatoshino, Sviatoshyne) is a historical neighborhood and a suburb of Ukraine's capital Kyiv. 

All other objects' names are derived from the name of Sviatoshyn neighbourhood:

Municipalities 
 Sviatoshyn Raion (Sviatoshynskyi) is a local municipality of Kyiv City, it includes Sviatoshyn neighborhood itself.
 Kyiv-Sviatoshyn Raion (Kyievo-Sviatoshynskyi) was before 2020 a local municipality of the Kyiv Oblast, it did not include Sviatoshyn neighborhood itself.

Transport 
 Sviatoshyn Airfield is an industrial airfield in Kyiv, belongs to Antonov.
  is a nodal passenger station of the Kyiv railway junction.
 Sviatoshyn (Kyiv Metro) is a station of Kyiv Metro's Sviatoshynsko-Brovarska Line.
 Sviatoshynsko-Brovarska Line is the first (red) line of the Kyiv Metro.
  (Sviatoshynskyi) is a former tram depot in Sviatoshyn.

City infrastructure 
  (Sviatoshynska) is a square in the Sviatoshyn Raion.
  (Sviatoshynska) is a street in the Sviatoshyn Raion.
  (Sviatoshynskyi) is a lane in the Sviatoshyn Raion.
  (Sviatoshynske) is a cemetery in the Sviatoshyn Raion.

Natural environment 
  (Sviatoshynskyi) is an urban forest in the Sviatoshyn Raion.
  (Sviatoshynske) is a community enterprise of the Kyiv City State Administration.
  (Sviatoshynske) is a subdivision of  that manages  itself.  

Euromaidan 
  (Sviatoshynska) is a confrontation at the night on 10 to 11 January 2014 in Sviatoshyn that was a part of Euromaidan.